Haligovce is a village and municipality in Stará Ľubovňa District in the Prešov Region of northern Slovakia. Former name of the village was "Hedvigina Poruba".

History
In historical records the village was first mentioned in 1338.

Geography
The municipality lies at an altitude of 600 metres and covers an area of 11.274 km². It has a population of about 683 people.

Genealogical resources

The records for genealogical research are available at the state archive "Statny Archiv in Levoca, Slovakia"

 Roman Catholic church records (births/marriages/deaths): 1750-1895(parish A)

See also
 List of municipalities and towns in Slovakia

External links
http://www.statistics.sk/mosmis/eng/run.html 
Surnames of living people in Haligovce

Villages and municipalities in Stará Ľubovňa District